Marlyn Earl Williams (born 9 January 1993) is a South African professional rugby union player, currently playing with the . His regular position is lock.

Rugby career

2010–2011 : Boland Cavaliers

2012–2013 : Border Bulldogs

He moved to East London for the 2012 season, representing the  team in Group B of the 2012 Under-19 Provincial Championship, again contributing a single try in their match against . He made ten appearances for the  team in the 2013 Under-21 Provincial Championship, scoring a try in their match against  in a disappointing season for a Border team that lost all twelve of their matches in Group A of the championship.

2014–present : Falcons

He remained in the starting line-up for the remainder of the competition, making a total of seven appearances as the Falcons finished second-bottom in the Northern Section of the competition with a solitary win. He remained in the starting line-up for the Currie Cup qualification series that kicked off a couple of months later. Williams played in all of their matches in the First Division, helping them secure three wins during the regular season to finish in fourth position to secure the final semi-final berth. He played off the bench in their semi-final match as the Falcons caused an upset, beating the top-of-the-log  31–24 in Potchefstroom.

Williams featured in all seven of the Falcons' matches in the 2015 Vodacom Cup, as the team improved on their 2014 performance by winning three of their matches, but still missed out on the play-offs after finishing in fifth position. A third-placed finish meant the Falcons qualified for the First Division again, with Williams only featuring once during the regular season in their final match against the Leopards. The team finished in fourth spot, which meant they met the same opposition a week later in the semi-finals. Williams came on as a replacement just after the hour mark, but could not help them emulate their 2015 semi-final success over the Leopards, with the side from Potchefstroom winning 29–17.

References

South African rugby union players
Living people
1993 births
Sportspeople from Paarl
Rugby union locks
Falcons (rugby union) players
Boland Cavaliers players
Rugby union players from the Western Cape
Tel Aviv Heat players
South African expatriate sportspeople in Israel
South African expatriate rugby union players
Expatriate rugby union players in Israel